"Bank Alert" is a 2016 song by Nigerian pop duo P-Square. It was recorded in Igbo and Pidgin English and samples lyrics from "Iyogo" by Onyeka Onwenu. It was released as a free download on 15 September and the next day, the accompanying music video was released on YouTube. The video was directed by Clarence Peters and Jude Okoye with cameo appearances by Phyno, Harrysong, Kcee, Onyeka Onwenu and Mr. Ibu among others.

As of 22 September 2016, "Bank Alert" has received over one million views.

A reviewer from Okay Africa described it as a "catchy song built on light guitars, bubbly synthesizers and a shuffling beat."

See also
List of songs recorded by P-Square

References

2016 songs
P-Square songs